Matthias David Mieves (born 30 December 1985) is a German politician of the Social Democratic Party (SPD) who has been serving as a member of the Bundestag since 2021.

Early life and education 
Mieves was born 1985 in the West German town of Zweibrücken. On a scholarship of the Hans-Böckler-Stiftung, he studied business administration.

Political career 
Mieves was elected directly to the Bundestag in 2021, representing the Kaiserslautern district. In parliament, he has since been serving on the Health Committee and the Committee on Digital Affairs. In this capacity, he is his parliamentary group's rapporteur on digitizing Germany's health system.

Other activities 
 German United Services Trade Union (ver.di), Member (since 2004)

References 

Living people
1985 births
Social Democratic Party of Germany politicians
Members of the Bundestag 2021–2025
21st-century German politicians
People from Zweibrücken
LGBT members of the Bundestag
German LGBT politicians
Gay politicians